|}

The Prix d'Ispahan is a Group 1 flat horse race in France open to thoroughbreds aged four years or older. It is run at Longchamp over a distance of 1,850 metres (about 1 mile and 1¼ furlongs), and it is scheduled to take place each year in May.

History
The inaugural running of the Prix d'Ispahan was the showpiece event of a meeting held at Longchamp on 13 July 1873. The meeting had been hastily arranged to honour the Shah of Persia, Naser al-Din Shah Qajar, who was making an official visit to Paris. The race was named after Ispahan, the French name for Isfahan, a former capital city of Persia.

The Prix d'Ispahan was initially contested over 3,000 metres, and it was originally open to horses aged three or older. Its distance was cut to 2,400 metres in its second year, and it was further reduced to 2,200 metres in 1891, and to 2,100 metres in 1903.

The race was abandoned throughout World War I, with no running from 1915 to 1918. Its present length, 1,850 metres, was introduced in 1921. It was cancelled once during World War II, in 1940. It was run over 2,000 metres at Le Tremblay in 1943 and 1944.

The present system of race grading began in 1971, and the Prix d'Ispahan was classed at the highest level, Group 1. The minimum age of participating horses was raised to four in 1987. It was staged at Chantilly in 1991, and at this venue its distance was 1,800 metres. The race was opened to geldings in 2001.

In 2020, Prix d'Ispahan moved to July and three years old horses can run by one time basis.

Records
Most successful horse (2 wins):
 Champaubert – 1897, 1898 (dead-heat)
 La Camargo – 1903, 1904
 Moulins la Marche – 1908, 1909
 Renette – 1935, 1936
 Hierocles – 1942, 1943
 Coaraze – 1946, 1947
 Fric – 1955, 1956
 Crystal Glitters – 1983, 1984
 Goldikova – 2010, 2011

Leading jockey (7 wins):
 Yves Saint-Martin – La Sega (1962), Jour et Nuit (1964), Silver Shark (1966), Zeddaan (1968), La Troublerie (1973), Allez France (1974), Crystal Glitters (1983)

Leading trainer (9 wins):
 André Fabre – Al Nasr (1982), Crystal Glitters (1984), Creator (1990), Arcangues (1993), Loup Sauvage (1998), Valixir (2005), Manduro (2007), Golden Lilac (2012), Persian King (2020)

Leading owner (8 wins):
 Marcel Boussac – Goyescas (1933), Hierocles (1942, 1943), Priam (1945), Coaraze (1946, 1947), Dynamiter (1951), Arbele (1952)

Winners since 1969

Earlier winners

 1873: Campeche
 1874: Franc Tireur
 1875: Paradoxe
 1876: Saxifrage
 1877: Gavarni
 1878: Jongleur
 1879: Courtois
 1880: Castillon
 1881: Alphonsine
 1882: Poulet
 1883: Veston
 1884: Farfadet
 1885: Despote
 1886: Viennois
 1887: Cambyse
 1888: Embellie
 1889: Le Sancy
 1890: Yellow
 1891: Amazone
 1892: Gil Peres
 1893: Saint Ferjeux
 1894: Algarade
 1895: Honneur
 1896: Le Sagittaire
 1897: Champaubert
 1898: Champaubert / Cambridge
 1899: Fourire
 1900: Cravan
 1901: Dido
 1902: Exema
 1903: La Camargo
 1904: La Camargo
 1905: Caius
 1906: Phoenix
 1907: Ouadi Halfa
 1908: Moulins la Marche
 1909: Moulins la Marche
 1910: Goloss
 1911: Ossian
 1912: Rouble
 1913: Foxling
 1914: Amilcar
 1915–18: no race
 1919: Radames
 1920: Le Rapin
 1921: La Finette
 1922: Kircubbin
 1923: Épinard
 1924: Premontre
 1925: Condover
 1926: Coram
 1927: Kitty
 1928: Rialto
 1929: Kantar
 1930: Alcyon
 1931: Four in Hand
 1932: Lovelace
 1933: Goyescas
 1934: Rodosto
 1935: Renette
 1936: Renette
 1937: Sanguinetto
 1938: Bistolfi
 1939: Turbulent
 1940: no race
 1941: Panipat
 1942: Hierocles
 1943: Hierocles
 1944: Un Gaillard
 1945: Priam
 1946: Coaraze
 1947: Coaraze
 1948: Bel Amour
 1949: Menetrier
 1950: Fort Napoleon
 1951: Dynamiter
 1952: Arbele
 1953: Sadi
 1954: Florin
 1955: Fric
 1956: Fric
 1957: Chief
 1958: Blockhaus
 1959: Hamanet
 1960: Tobago
 1961: Javelot
 1962: La Sega
 1963: Manderley
 1964: Jour et Nuit
 1965: Esso
 1966: Silver Shark
 1967: Caldarello
 1968: Zeddaan

See also
 List of French flat horse races

References

 France Galop / Racing Post:
 galop.courses-france.com:
 1873–1889, 1890–1919, 1920–1949, 1950–1979, 1980–present

 france-galop.com – A Brief History: Prix d'Ispahan.
 galopp-sieger.de – Prix d'Ispahan.
 ifhaonline.org – International Federation of Horseracing Authorities – Prix d'Ispahan (2019).
 pedigreequery.com – Prix d'Ispahan – Longchamp.

Open mile category horse races
Longchamp Racecourse
Horse races in France
Recurring sporting events established in 1873
1873 establishments in France